Heshima Salim Thompson (born 23 October 1986) is a British actor and singer.

Born in the London Borough of Brent, son of Jamaican Reggae singer Dr Alimantado and brother of soul singer Zalon.

In 2001, Heshima began his career singing on BBC Documentary Heart of Harlesden, he was scouted from the documentary to play a lead role in BBC’s Babyfather. He has appeared on television in  Spooks, Spooks: Code 9 as Jez, Prime Suspect, Casualty, City Lights and Judge John Deed. In theatre he has appeared at The Young Vic in Generations and at The Royal Court in Incomplete and Random Acts of Violence. In 2009, he was nominated for a Screen Nation Award in the Young Shooting Star category. Heshima toured with Amy Winehouse along with brother Zalon on her Back to Black album which was only scheduled to last for 3 months, but the tour was so successful they ended up touring for six years and collected five Grammy Awards.

In 2009, he auditioned for the sixth series of The X Factor and in 2011, he auditioned for the eighth series. In 2010, he was cast as Asher Levi in series 2 of EastEnders: E20.

In March 2012, Thompson auditioned for the first series of The Voice UK After four chair turns, Heshima chose will.i.am as his coach and made it to the battle rounds of the competition. Heshima worked with Zalon, Salaam Remi and Mark Ronson singing and vocal producing on Amy Winehouse's Album Lioness: Hidden Treasures including singles "Our Day Will Come" and "Like Smoke", which features Nas. Lioness: Hidden Treasures debuted at number one on the UK Albums Chart.

In 2014, Heshima founded HTG Entertainment a British entertainment agency.

Filmography

References

External links

1986 births
Living people
Male actors from London
Black British male actors
21st-century Black British male singers
English pop singers
People from the London Borough of Brent
The X Factor (British TV series) contestants
The Voice UK contestants
English male soap opera actors
English people of Ghanaian descent